Benigna Machiavelli is a 1914 novel by Charlotte Perkins Gilman, featuring a young woman, evoking Niccolò Machiavelli, as she maneuvers through the restrictive society of early 19th century America.

Reception
Ann J. Lane called it "a handbook on survival in the modern world for a girl-woman".

References

External links
Text of Benigna Machiavelli, on Archive.org
 

Novels by Charlotte Perkins Gilman
1914 novels